Trnjani is a village in the municipality of Doboj, Bosnia and Herzegovina.

References

Villages in Republika Srpska
Populated places in Doboj

fr:Trnjani